Tangia Tongiia is a Cook Island former professional rugby league footballer who played as a er in the 1990s and 2000s. He played at representative level for the Cook Islands, and at club level in New Zealand for the Papanui Tigers and the Canterbury Bulls.

Playing career
Tongiia played for the Papanui club in the Canterbury Rugby League competition during the 1998 and 1999 seasons.

He then was picked to represent the Canterbury Bulls in the 2000, 2001 and 2002 Bartercard Cups.

Representative career
Tongiia won caps for Cook Islands in the 2000 Rugby League World Cup.

Note
Tangia's surname is variously spelt with one, or two i's, i.e. Tongia, or Tongiia.

References

External links

Cook Islands national rugby league team players
Cook Island rugby league players
Place of birth missing (living people)
Year of birth missing (living people)
Canterbury rugby league team players
Riccarton Knights players
Papanui Tigers players
Rugby league wingers
Living people